Astronauta – Magnetar (Astronaut - Magnetar) is a  2012 Brazilian graphic novel written and illustrated by Danilo Beyruth based on the character Astronauta created by Maurício de Sousa. It is the first installment in the Graphic MSP series of graphic novels based on Maurício de Sousa characters.

Synopsis
The Astronaut visits a distant galaxy to study a magnetar, a neutron star that has a magnetic field estimated at one billion teslas. But he makes a mistake that can cost his life.

Now, with the damaged spaceship and without communication, he is "shipwrecked in space" and needs to find a way to escape before being defeated by the insanity that insists on taking his mind. The output can be in combining the technology to the teachings of his long deceased grandfather.

Other languages
In addition to Portuguese, Astronauta - Magnetar has been translated into these languages.

Other medias 
At Comic Con Experience 2017, it was released a teaser of animated television miniseries based on the graphic novels produced by Danilo Beyruth and Cris Peter.  At Comic Con Experience 2018, Mauricio de Sousa Produções revealed that the miniseries would be titled Astronauta – Propulsão  and will be coproduced and exhibited by HBO.

References

2012 graphic novels
Monica's Gang
Brazilian graphic novels
Science fiction graphic novels
Works about astronauts
Comics set in outer space
Prêmio Angelo Agostini winners